Newport High School Old Boys (NHSOB) are a Welsh rugby union club based in Caerleon on the northern outskirts of Newport in South Wales. They currently play in the Welsh Rugby Union Division Two and is a feeder club for the Newport Gwent Dragons.

Newport HSOB RFC were recognised by the Welsh Rugby Union as the biggest community rugby club in Wales in November 2007. The club provides a full range of teams for all age groups and a full female team at all levels. They have ex-players at all levels of the game. They also provide rugby training for children and adults with learning disabilities. The 'Old Boys' have a close rivalry with nearby rugby club Caerleon R.F.C.

Early history

Newport High School Old Boys Rugby Club has been in existence for nearly 85 years having been founded in the season of 1923/24. Although the present ground at Yew Tree Lane, Caerleon has been the club's home for many years, as a club, it has led a very nomadic existence.  During the early years the teams played on pitches at the Royal Oak, Bettws, Ponthir, Llanfrechfa, and the old Caerleon Racecourse. In 1949 a field at the present site at Yew Tree Lane became available for rent and this was to become the club's permanent home.

A major milestone was achieved in 1954 when probationary membership of the Welsh Rugby Union was granted, followed by full WRU membership in 1957. Eventually the land was developed and a new pitch and club house were built and officially opened in 1967. Membership was opened to non Old Boys of Newport High School in the mid sixties and as a result, by the early seventies the club had four senior teams.

Notable former players
See also :Category:Newport HSOB RFC players
  David Burcher, Wales and British Lions international
  Jamie Corsi
  Mark Davies, Wales international
  Keith Jarrett, Wales and British Lions international
  Ceri Jones, Wales international
  John O'Shea, Wales and British Lions international
  Alix Popham, Wales international
  Matthew Robinson, Wales international
  John Ryan, former Wales national team Head Coach
  Ashley Smith
  Alex Walker
  David Watkins, Wales and British Lions international
  Stuart Watkins, Wales and British Lions international

External links
NHSOB Official website

References 

Welsh rugby union teams
Rugby union clubs in Newport, Wales
Rugby clubs established in 1923
Caerleon